The Hendee Hotel is a historic hotel building in Cozad, Nebraska. It was built in 1879 for John J. Cozad, the founder of the city of Cozad. One of his sons, Robert Henri, became a painter. Cozad shot a man in 1882, and he sold the hotel to Stephen A. Hendee, who remained its owner until 1910. From 1883 to 1885, it was rented to A. K. Maryott, whose son was painter Miles Maryott. The building has been listed on the National Register of Historic Places since March 21, 1979. 

It is the main building of the Robert Henri Museum.

It is close to, but not included in, the Cozad Downtown Historic District, which was listed on the National Register in 2018.

References

External links

National Register of Historic Places in Dawson County, Nebraska
Hotel buildings completed in 1879
1879 establishments in Nebraska